Daniel Gilman may refer to:

Daniel Coit Gilman (1831–1908), American educator and academician
Daniel Hunt Gilman (1845–1913), railroad builder